The following is a list of political parties registered at the Ministry of Interior, Spain, from 1976-2002.

Note that:

 The Ministry does not appear to remove registrations if parties become inactive or are dissolved, and many of the groups no longer exist.
 Some of the groups were actually electoral alliances formed to contest a specific election.
 Some of the groups are regional affiliates or branches of a national party.
 Some of the organizations are actually the youth wings of larger political parties.
 Parties are listed by Spanish name, English name, by city, and in chronological order.
Democracia Cristiana Aragonesa (Aragonese Christian Democracy), Zaragosa, 1977-03-10
Partido Socialista de Aragón (Socialist Party of Aragon), Zaragoza, 1977-03-21
Partido Aragonés (Aragonese Party), Zaragoza, 1978-02-03
Movimiento Aragonés Social (Social Aragonese Movement), Zaragoza, 1983-02-21
Partido Democráta Liberal Aragonés (Aragonese Liberal Democratic Party), Zaragoza, 1983-02-21
Partido Comunista de Aragón (Communist Party of Aragon), Zaragoza, 1983-03-09
Movimiento Nacionalista Aragonés, Zaragoza, 1983-05-25
Chunta Aragonesista (Unión Aragonesista - Unió Aragonesista), Zaragoza, 1986-10-22
Unión Social Española, Zaragoza, 1988-01-26
Unión del Pueblo Aragonés, Zaragoza, 1990-04-06
Partido Aragonés Regionalista, Zaragoza, 1990-05-03
Partido Nacionalista de Aragón-Unidad Verde Aragonesista, Zaragoza, 1990-06-11
Partido Aragonesista-Izquierda de Aragón, Zaragoza, 1990-07-30
Partido Aragonés Independiente, *Maluenda, 1991-02-15
Unión de la Izquierda Socialista de Aragón, Zaragoza, 1991-04-15
Izquierda de Aragón, Zaragoza, 1992-03-13
Partido Aragón al Senado, Zaragoza, 1993-04-27
Unidad Aragonesa, Zaragoza, 1994-11-02
Dinámica Social Aragonesa, Zaragoza, 1995-03-10
Partido Federación Independiente de Trabajadores y Autónomos, Zaragoza, 1995-03-28
Iniciativa por Zaragoza, Zaragoza, 1995-06-23
Iniciativa Aragonesa, Zaragoza, 1996-03-28
Iniciativa por Aragón, Zaragoza, 1996-09-25
Colectivo de Convergencia - Partido de la Izquierda del Moncayo, *Tarazona, 1999-03-16

Zaragoza
Political parties Zaragoza